Lienardia rigida is a species of sea snail, a marine gastropod mollusk in the family Clathurellidae.

Description
The size of an adult shell varies between 6.3 mm and 8 mm. The color of the shell is fulvous. The shoulder undulates at the angle by the longitudinal ribs, which are crossed by raised striae.

Distribution
This species occurs in the Pacific Ocean off Baja California, Panama and the Galapagos Islands.

References

 Wiedrick S.G. (2017). Aberrant geomorphological affinities in four conoidean gastropod genera, Clathurella Carpenter, 1857 (Clathurellidae), Lienardia Jousseaume, 1884 (Clathurellidae), Etrema Hedley, 1918 (Clathurellidae) and Hemilienardia Boettger, 1895 (Raphitomidae), with the description of fourteen new Hemilienardia species from the Indo-Pacific. The Festivus. special issue: 2-45

External links
 Hinds R. B. (1843). On new species of Pleurotoma, Clavatula, and Mangelia. Proceedings of the Zoological Society of London. 11: 36-46

rigida